The name Malasana is used for various squatting asanas in hatha yoga and modern yoga as exercise.

Traditionally, and in B. K. S. Iyengar's Light on Yoga, Malasana, or Garland Pose, is used for a squatting pose with the feet together and the back rounded with multiple hand placement variations. When the hands are bound around the back this pose is called Kanchyasana ("golden belt pose").

In the West, the name Malasana is also used for the regular squat pose, Upaveshasana, in which the hand palms are folded together in Anjali Mudra in front of the chest, and the feet are set wider apart.

Etymology 

The name Malasana is from the Sanskrit "माला" mālā, a garland, necklace, or rosary; and "आसन" āsana, "seat" or "posture". According to Iyengar, the name derives from the arms "hanging from the neck like a garland". Under the name Malasana, the 19th-century Sritattvanidhi illustrates what is now called Bhujapidasana (the shoulder press), a pose in which the body is completely supported on the hands.

Description and variants 

The name malasana is used for the following asanas:

Upaveshasana 

The name Malasana is sometimes used in the West for the regular squat pose, Upaveshasana, in which the palms of the hands are folded together in Anjali Mudra (prayer posture) in front of the chest, and the feet are set apart. Yoga Journal states that Malasana stretches the ankles, groins and back, and tones the belly, but cautions about using the asana when there are lower back or knee injuries. A variant of this pose, Prapadasana, has the heels together and the feet on tiptoe.

Malasana I/Kanchyasana 
In the first variant, also called Kanchyasana ("golden belt pose"), the feet are together with the arms wrapped around the back, while the chin touches the floor.

Malasana II 
In the second variant, the hands wrap around the heels, and the chin touches the floor.

See also 

 List of asanas

Notes

References

Sources

 
 
 
 

Standing asanas
Forward bend asanas